The Mountain Meadows Massacre (September 7–11, 1857) was a series of attacks during the  Utah War that resulted in the mass murder of at least 120 members of the Baker–Fancher emigrant wagon train. The massacre occurred in the southern Utah Territory at Mountain Meadows, and was perpetrated by the Mormon settlers belonging to the Utah Territorial Militia (officially called the Nauvoo Legion) who recruited and were aided by some Southern Paiute Native Americans. The wagon train, made up mostly of families from Arkansas, was bound for California, traveling on the Old Spanish Trail that passed through the Territory.

After arriving in Salt Lake City, the Baker–Fancher party made their way south along the Mormon Road, eventually stopping to rest at Mountain Meadows. As the party was traveling west there were rumors about the party's behavior towards Mormons, and war hysteria towards outsiders was rampant as a result of a military expedition dispatched by President Buchanan and Territorial Governor Brigham Young's declaration of martial law in response. While the emigrants were camped at the meadow, local militia leaders, including Isaac C. Haight and John D. Lee, made plans to attack the wagon train. The leaders of the militia, wanting to give the impression of tribal hostilities, persuaded Southern Paiutes to join with a larger party of militiamen disguised as Native Americans in an attack. During the militia's first assault on the wagon train, the emigrants fought back, and a five-day siege ensued. Eventually, fear spread among the militia's leaders that some emigrants had caught sight of the white men, likely discerning the actual identity of a majority of the attackers. As a result, militia commander William H. Dame ordered his forces to kill the emigrants. By this time, the emigrants were running low on water and provisions, and allowed some members of the militia—who approached under a white flag—to enter their camp. The militia members assured the emigrants they were protected, and after handing over their weapons, the emigrants were escorted away from their defensive position. After walking a distance from the camp, the militiamen, with the help of auxiliary forces hiding nearby, attacked the emigrants. The perpetrators killed all the adults and older children in the group, in the end sparing only seventeen young children under the age of seven.

Following the massacre, the perpetrators buried some of the remains but ultimately left most of the bodies exposed to wild animals and the climate. Local families took in the surviving children, with many of the victims' possessions and remaining livestock being auctioned off. Investigations, which were interrupted by the American Civil War, resulted in nine indictments in 1874. Of the men who were indicted, only John D. Lee was tried in a court of law. After two trials in the Utah Territory, Lee was convicted by a jury, sentenced to death, and executed by Utah firing squad on March 23, 1877.

Historians attribute the massacre to a combination of factors, including war hysteria about a possible invasion of Mormon territory and Mormon teachings against outsiders, which were part of the Mormon Reformation period. Scholars debate whether senior Mormon leadership, including Brigham Young, directly instigated the massacre or if responsibility for it lay only with the local leaders in southern Utah.

History

Baker–Fancher party

In early 1857, the Baker–Fancher party was formed from several groups mainly from Marion, Crawford, Carroll, and Johnson counties in northwestern Arkansas. They assembled into a wagon train at Beller's Stand, south of Harrison, to emigrate to southern California. The group was initially referred to as both the Baker train and the Perkins train, but later referred to as the Baker–Fancher train (or party). It was named after "Colonel" Alexander Fancher who, having already made the journey to California twice before, had become its main leader. By contemporary standards the Baker–Fancher party was prosperous, carefully organized, and well-equipped for the journey. They were joined along the way by families and individuals from other states, including Missouri. The group was relatively wealthy, and planned to restock its supplies in Salt Lake City, as did most wagon trains at the time.

Interactions with Mormon settlers

At the time of the Fanchers' arrival, the Utah Territory was organized as a theocratic democracy under the leadership of Brigham Young, who had established colonies along the California Trail and the Old Spanish Trail. President James Buchanan had recently issued an order to send troops to Utah which led to rumors being spread in the territory about its motives. Young issued various orders that urged the local population to prepare for the arrival of the troops. Eventually Young issued a declaration of martial law.

The Baker–Fancher party was refused stocks in Salt Lake City and chose to leave there and take the Old Spanish Trail, which passed through southern Utah. In August 1857, the Mormon apostle George A. Smith traveled throughout the southern part of the territory instructing the settlers to stockpile grain. While on his return trip to Salt Lake City, Smith camped near the Baker–Fancher party on August 25 at Corn Creek.

While most witnesses said that the Fanchers were in general a peaceful party whose members behaved well along the trail, rumors spread about their supposed misdeeds.  U.S. Army Brevet Major James Henry Carleton led the first federal investigation of the murders, published in 1859. He recorded Hamblin's account that the train was alleged to have poisoned a spring near Corn Creek; this resulted in the deaths of 18 head of cattle and two or three people who ate the contaminated meat. Carleton interviewed the father of a child who allegedly died from this poisoned spring, and accepted the sincerity of the grieving father. But, he also included a statement from an investigator who did not believe the Fancher party was capable of poisoning the spring, given its size. Carleton invited readers to consider a potential explanation for the rumors of misdeeds, noting the general atmosphere of distrust among Mormons for strangers at the time, and that some locals appeared jealous of the Fancher party's wealth.

Conspiracy and siege

Haight and Dame were, in addition, the senior regional military leaders of the Nauvoo Legion. As the Baker–Fancher party approached, several meetings were held in Cedar City and nearby Parowan by the local Latter Day Saint (LDS) leaders pondering how to implement Young's declaration of martial law. On the afternoon of Sunday, September 6, Haight held his weekly Stake High Council meeting after church services and brought up the issue of what to do with the emigrants. The plan for a Native American massacre was discussed, but not all the Council members agreed it was the right approach. The Council resolved to take no action until Haight sent a rider, James Haslam, out the next day to carry an express to Salt Lake City (a six-day round trip on horseback) for Brigham Young's advice, as Utah did not yet have a telegraph system. Following the council, Isaac C. Haight decided to send a messenger south to John D. Lee. What Haight told Lee remains a mystery, but considering the timing it may have had something to do with Council's decision to wait for advice from Brigham Young.

The dispirited Baker–Fancher party found water and fresh grazing for its livestock after reaching grassy, mountain-ringed Mountain Meadows, a widely known stopover on the old Spanish Trail, in early September. They anticipated several days of rest and recuperation there before the next  would take them out of Utah. On September 7, the party was attacked by Nauvoo Legion militiamen dressed as Native Americans and some Native American Paiutes. The Baker–Fancher party defended itself by encircling and lowering their wagons, wheels chained together, along with digging shallow trenches and throwing dirt both below and into the wagons, which made a strong barrier. Seven emigrants were killed during the opening attack and buried somewhere within the wagon encirclement. Sixteen more were wounded. The attack continued for five days, during which the besieged families had little or no access to freshwater or game food and their ammunition was depleted. Meanwhile, organization among the local Mormon leadership reportedly broke down. Eventually, fear spread among the militia's leaders that some emigrants had caught sight of white men, and had probably discerned the identity of their attackers. This resulted in an order to kill all the emigrants, with the exception of small children.

Killings and aftermath of the massacre

On Friday, September 11, 1857, two militiamen approached the Baker–Fancher party wagons with a white flag and were soon followed by Indian Agent and militia officer John D. Lee. Lee told the battle-weary emigrants that he had negotiated a truce with the Paiutes. Accepting this offer, the emigrants were led out of their fortification, with the adult men being separated from the women and children. The men were paired with a militia escort and when the signal was given, the militiamen turned and shot the male members of the Baker–Fancher party standing by their side. The women and children were then ambushed and killed by more militia that were hiding in nearby bushes and ravines. Members of the militia were sworn to secrecy. A plan was set to blame the massacre on the Native Americans.

The militia did not kill small children who were deemed too young to relate what had happened. Nancy Huff, one of the seventeen survivors and just over four years old at the time of the massacre, recalled in an 1875 statement that an eighteenth survivor was killed directly in front of the other children. "At the close of the massacre there was eighteen children still alive, one girl, some ten or twelve years old, they said was too big and could tell, so they killed her, leaving seventeen." The survivors were taken in by local Mormon families. Seventeen of the children were later reclaimed by the U.S. Army and returned to relatives in Arkansas. The treatment of these children while they were held by the Mormons is uncertain, but Captain James Lynch's statement in May 1859 said the surviving children were "in a most wretched condition, half starved, half naked, filthy, infested with vermin, and their eyes diseased from the cruel neglect to which had been exposed." Lynch's July 1859 affidavit added that they when they first saw the children they had "little or no clothing" and were "covered with filth and dirt".

Leonard J. Arrington, founder of the Mormon History Association, reports that Brigham Young received the rider, James Haslam, at his office on the same day. When he learned what was contemplated by the militia leaders in Parowan and Cedar City, he sent back a letter stating the Baker–Fancher party was not to be meddled with, and should be allowed to go in peace (although he acknowledged the Native Americans would likely "do as they pleased"). Young's letter arrived two days too late, on September 13, 1857.

The livestock and personal property of the Baker–Fancher party, including women's jewelry, clothing and bedstuffs were distributed or auctioned off to Mormons. Some of the surviving children saw clothing and jewelry that had belonged to their dead mothers and sisters subsequently being worn by Mormon women and the journalist J.H. Beadle said that jewelry taken from Mountain Meadows was seen in Salt Lake City.

Investigations and prosecutions

An early investigation was conducted by Brigham Young, who interviewed John D. Lee on September 29, 1857. In 1858, Young sent a report to the Commissioner of Indian Affairs stating that the massacre was the work of Native Americans. The Utah War delayed any investigation by the U.S. federal government until 1859, when Jacob Forney and U.S. Army Brevet Major James Henry Carleton conducted investigations. In Carleton's investigation, at Mountain Meadows he found women's hair tangled in sage brush and the bones of children still in their mothers' arms. Carleton later said it was "a sight which can never be forgotten." After gathering up the skulls and bones of those who had died, Carleton's troops buried them and erected a cairn and cross.

Carleton interviewed a few local Mormon settlers and Paiute Native American chiefs and concluded that there was Mormon involvement in the massacre. He issued a report in May 1859, addressed to the U.S. Assistant Adjutant-General, setting forth his findings. Jacob Forney, Superintendent of Indian Affairs for Utah, also conducted an investigation that included visiting the region in the summer of 1859. Forney retrieved many of the surviving children of massacre victims who had been housed with Mormon families and gathered them up for transportation to their relatives in Arkansas. He concluded that the Paiutes did not act alone and the massacre would not have occurred without the white settlers, while Carleton's report to the U.S. Congress called the mass killings a "heinous crime", blaming both local and senior church leaders for the massacre.

In March 1859, Judge John Cradlebaugh, a federal judge brought into the territory after the Utah War, convened a grand jury in Provo concerning the massacre, but the jury declined any indictments. Nevertheless, Cradlebaugh conducted a tour of the Mountain Meadows area with a military escort. He attempted to arrest John D. Lee, Isaac Haight, and John Higbee, who fled before they could be found. Cradlebaugh publicly charged Brigham Young as an instigator to the massacre and therefore an "accessory before the fact". Possibly as a protective measure against the mistrusted federal court system, Mormon territorial probate court judge Elias Smith arrested Young under a territorial warrant, perhaps hoping to divert any trial of Young into a friendly Mormon territorial court. Apparently because no federal charges ensued, Young was released.

Further investigations were cut short by the American Civil War in 1861, but proceeded in 1871 when prosecutors obtained the affidavit of militia member Philip Klingensmith. Klingensmith had been a bishop and blacksmith from Cedar City; by the 1870s, however, he had left the church and moved to Nevada.

Lee was arrested on November 7, 1874. Dame, Philip Klingensmith, Ellott Willden, and George Adair, Jr. were indicted and arrested while warrants to pursue the arrests of four others who had gone into hiding (Haight, Higbee, William C. Stewart, and Samuel Jukes) were being obtained. Klingensmith escaped prosecution by agreeing to testify. Brigham Young removed some participants including Haight and Lee from the LDS Church in 1870. The U.S. posted bounties of $5000 ($ in present-day funds) each for the capture of Haight, Higbee, Stewart, and Klingensmith.

Lee's first trial began on July 23, 1875, in Beaver, before a jury of eight Mormons and four non-Mormons. One of Lee's defense attorneys was Enos D. Hoge, a former territorial supreme court justice. The trial led to a hung jury on August 5, 1875. Lee's second trial began September 13, 1876, before an all-Mormon jury. The prosecution called Daniel Wells, Laban Morrill, Joel White, Samuel Knight, Samuel McMurdy, Nephi Johnson, and Jacob Hamblin. Lee also stipulated, against advice of counsel, that the prosecution be allowed to re-use the depositions of Young and Smith from the previous trial. Lee called no witnesses in his defense, and was convicted.

Lee was entitled under Utah Territorial statute to choose the method of his execution from three possible options: hanging, firing squad, or decapitation. At sentencing, Lee chose to be executed by firing squad. In his final words before his sentence was carried out at Mountain Meadows on March 23, 1877, Lee said that he was a scapegoat for others involved. Brigham Young stated that Lee's fate was just, but it was not a sufficient blood atonement, given the enormity of the crime.

Criticism and analysis of the massacre

Media coverage about the event

Initial published reports of the incident date back at least to October 1857 in the Los Angeles Star. A notable report on the incident was made in 1859 by Carleton, who had been tasked by the U.S. Army to investigate the incident and bury the still exposed corpses at Mountain Meadows. The first period of intense nationwide publicity about the massacre began around 1872 after investigators obtained Klingensmith's confession. In 1868 C. V. Waite published "An Authentic History Of Brigham Young" which described the events. In 1872, Mark Twain commented on the massacre through the lens of contemporary American public opinion in an appendix to his semi-autobiographical travel book Roughing It. In 1873, the massacre was given a full chapter in T. B. H. Stenhouse's Mormon history The Rocky Mountain Saints. The massacre itself also received international attention, with various international and national newspapers also covering John D. Lee's 1874 and 1877 trials as well as his execution in 1877.

The massacre has been treated extensively by several historical works, beginning with Lee's own Confession in 1877, expressing his opinion that George A. Smith was sent to southern Utah by Brigham Young to direct the massacre.

In 1910, the massacre was the subject of a short book by Josiah F. Gibbs, who also attributed responsibility for the massacre to Young and Smith. The first detailed and comprehensive work using modern historical methods was The Mountain Meadows Massacre in 1950 by Juanita Brooks, a Mormon scholar who lived near the area in southern Utah. Brooks found no evidence of direct involvement by Brigham Young, but charged him with obstructing the investigation and provoking the attack through his rhetoric.

Initially, the LDS Church denied any involvement by Mormons, and was relatively silent on the issue. In 1872, it excommunicated some of the participants for their role in the massacre. Since then, the LDS Church has condemned the massacre and acknowledged involvement by local Mormon leaders. In September 2007, the LDS Church published an article marking 150 years since the tragedy occurred, containing its first official apology about the massacre.

Varying perspectives of the massacre
As described by Richard E. Turley Jr., Ronald W. Walker, and Glen M. Leonard, historians from different backgrounds have taken different approaches to describe the massacre and those involved: 
Portrayal of the perpetrators (white Mormon settlers) as fundamentally good and the Baker-Fancher party as evil people who committed outrageous acts of anti-Mormon instigation prior to the massacre; 
The polar opposite view, that the perpetrators were evil and that the emigrants were innocent;
Both the perpetrators and victims of the massacre were complicated, and that many different coinciding circumstances led the Mormon settlers to commit an atrocity against travelers who, regardless of the authenticity of any unfounded claims of anti-Mormon behavior, did not deserve the punishment of death.

Prior to 1985, many textbooks available in Utah Public Schools blamed the Paiute people as primarily responsible for the massacre, or placed equal blame on the Paiute and Mormon settlers (if they mentioned the massacre at all).

Theories explaining the massacre
Historians have ascribed the massacre to a number of factors, including strident Mormon teachings in the years prior to the massacre, war hysteria, and alleged involvement of Brigham Young.

Strident Mormon teachings

For the decade prior to the Baker–Fancher party's arrival there, Utah Territory existed as a theodemocracy led by Brigham Young. During the mid-1850s, Young instituted a Mormon Reformation, intending to "lay the axe at the root of the tree of sin and iniquity". In January 1856, Young said "the government of God, as administered here" may to some seem "despotic" because "...judgment is dealt out against the transgression of the law of God."

In addition, during the preceding decades, the religion had undergone a period of intense persecution in the American Midwest. In particular, they were officially expelled from, and an Extermination Order was issued by Governor Boggs, of the state of Missouri during the 1838 Mormon War, during which prominent Mormon apostle David W. Patten was killed in battle. After Mormons moved to Nauvoo, Illinois, the religion's founder Joseph Smith and his brother Hyrum Smith were killed in 1844. Following these events, faithful Mormons migrated west hoping to escape persecution. However, in May 1857, just months before the Mountain Meadows massacre, apostle Parley P. Pratt was shot dead in Arkansas by Hector McLean, the estranged husband of Eleanor McLean Pratt, one of Pratt's plural wives. Parley Pratt and Eleanor entered a Celestial marriage (under the theocratic law of the Utah Territory), but Hector had refused Eleanor a divorce. "When she left San Francisco she left Hector, and later she was to state in a court of law that she had left him as a wife the night he drove her from their home. Whatever the legal situation, she thought of herself as an unmarried woman."

Mormon leaders immediately proclaimed Pratt as another martyr, with Brigham Young stating, "Nothing has happened so hard to reconcile my mind to since the death of Joseph." Many Mormons held the people of Arkansas collectively responsible. "It was in accordance with Mormon policy to hold every Arkansan accountable for Pratt's death, just as every Missourian was hated because of the expulsion of the church from that state."

Mormon leaders were teaching that the Second Coming of Jesus was imminent – "...there are those now living upon the earth who will live to see the consummation" and "...we now bear witness that his coming is near at hand". Based on a somewhat ambiguous statement by Joseph Smith, some Mormons believed that Jesus would return in 1891 and that God would soon exact punishment against the United States for persecuting Mormons and martyring Joseph Smith, Hyrum Smith, Patten and Pratt. In their Endowment ceremony, faithful early Latter-day Saints took an oath to pray that God would take vengeance against the murderers. As a result of this oath, several Mormon apostles and other leaders considered it their religious duty to kill the prophets' murderers if they ever came across them. The sermons, blessings, and private counsel by Mormon leaders just before the Mountain Meadows massacre can be understood as encouraging private individuals to execute God's judgment against the wicked.

In Cedar City, the teachings of church leaders were particularly strident. Mormons in Cedar City were taught that members should ignore dead bodies and go about their business. Col. William H. Dame, the ranking officer in southern Utah who ordered the Mountain Meadows massacre, received a patriarchal blessing in 1854 that he would "be called to act at the head of a portion of thy Brethren and of the Lamanites (Native Americans) in the redemption of Zion and the avenging of the blood of the prophets upon them that dwell on the earth". In June 1857, Philip Klingensmith, another participant, was similarly blessed that he would participate in "avenging the blood of Brother Joseph".

Thus, historians argue that southern Utah Mormons would have been particularly affected by an unsubstantiated rumor that the Baker–Fancher wagon train had been joined by a group of eleven miners and plainsmen who called themselves "Missouri Wildcats", some of whom reportedly taunted, vandalized and "caused trouble" for Mormons and Native Americans along the route (by some accounts claiming that they had the gun that "shot the guts out of Old Joe Smith"). They were also affected by the report to Brigham Young that the Baker–Fancher party was from Arkansas where Pratt was murdered. It was rumored that Pratt's wife recognized some of the Mountain Meadows party as being in the gang that shot and stabbed Pratt.

War hysteria

The Mountain Meadows massacre was caused in part by events relating to the Utah War, an 1857 deployment toward the Utah Territory of the United States Army, whose arrival was peaceful. In the summer of 1857, however, the Mormons expected an all-out invasion of apocalyptic significance. From July to September 1857, Mormon leaders and their followers prepared for a siege that could have ended up similar to the seven-year Bleeding Kansas problem occurring at the time. Mormons were required to stockpile grain, and were enjoined against selling grain to emigrants for use as cattle feed. As far-off Mormon colonies retreated, Parowan and Cedar City became isolated and vulnerable outposts. Brigham Young sought to enlist the help of Native American tribes in fighting the "Americans", encouraging them to steal cattle from emigrant trains, and to join Mormons in fighting the approaching army.

Scholars have asserted that George A. Smith's tour of southern Utah influenced the decision to attack and destroy the Fancher–Baker emigrant train near Mountain Meadows, Utah. He met with many of the eventual participants in the massacre, including W. H. Dame, Isaac Haight, John D. Lee and Chief Jackson, leader of a band of Paiutes. He noted that the militia was organized and ready to fight and that some of them were eager to "fight and take vengeance for the cruelties that had been inflicted upon us in the States."
Among Smith's party were a number of Paiute Native American chiefs from the Mountain Meadows area. When Smith returned to Salt Lake, Brigham Young met with these leaders on September 1, 1857, and encouraged them to fight against the Americans in the anticipated clash with the U.S. Army. They were also offered all of the livestock then on the road to California, which included that belonging to the Baker–Fancher party. The Native American chiefs were reluctant, and at least one objected they had previously been told not to steal, and declined the offer.

Brigham Young

There is a consensus among historians that Brigham Young played a role in provoking the massacre, at least unwittingly, and in concealing its evidence after the fact. However, they debate whether Young knew about the planned massacre ahead of time and whether he initially condoned it before later taking a strong public stand against it. Young's use of inflammatory and violent language in response to the Federal expedition added to the tense atmosphere at the time of the attack. Following the massacre, Young stated in public forums that God had taken vengeance on the Baker–Fancher party. It is unclear whether Young held this view because he believed that this specific group posed an actual threat to colonists or because he believed that the group was directly responsible for past crimes against Mormons. However, in Young's only known correspondence prior to the massacre, he told the Church leaders in Cedar City:

According to historian MacKinnon, "After the [Utah] war, U.S. President James Buchanan implied that face-to-face communications with Brigham Young might have averted the conflict, and Young argued that a north-south telegraph line in Utah could have prevented the Mountain Meadows massacre." MacKinnon suggests that hostilities could have been avoided if Young had traveled east to Washington D.C. to resolve governmental problems instead of taking a five-week trip north on the eve of the Utah War for church-related reasons.

A modern forensic assessment of a key affidavit, purportedly given by William Edwards in 1924, has complicated the debate on complicity of senior Mormon leadership in the Mountain Meadows massacre. Analysis indicates that Edwards's signature may have been traced and that the typeset belonged to a typewriter manufactured in the 1950s. The Utah State Historical Society, which maintains the document in its archives, acknowledges a possible connection to Mark Hofmann, a convicted forger and extortionist, via go-between Lyn Jacobs who provided the society with the document.

Remembrances

The first monument for the victims was built two years after the massacre, by Major Carleton and the U.S. Army. This monument was a simple cairn built over the gravesite of 34 victims, and was topped by a large cedar cross. The monument was found destroyed and the structure was replaced by the U.S. Army in 1864. By some reports, the monument was destroyed in 1861, when Young brought an entourage to Mountain Meadows. Wilford Woodruff, who later became President of the Church, claimed that upon reading the inscription on the cross, which read, "Vengeance is mine, thus saith the Lord. I shall repay", Young responded, "it should be vengeance is mine and I have taken a little." In 1932 residents of the surrounding area constructed a memorial wall around the remnants of the monument.

Starting in 1988, the Mountain Meadows Association, composed of descendants of both the Baker–Fancher party victims and the Mormon participants, designed a new monument in the meadows; this monument was completed in 1990 and is maintained by the Utah State Division of Parks and Recreation. In 1999 The Church of Jesus Christ of Latter-day Saints replaced the U.S. Army's cairn and the 1932 memorial wall with a second monument, which it now maintains. In August 1999, when the LDS Church's construction of the 1999 monument had started, the remains of at least 28 massacre victims were dug up by a backhoe. The forensic evidence showed that the remains of the males had been shot by firearms at close range and that the remains of the women and children showed evidence of blunt force trauma.

In 1955, to memorialize the victims of the massacre, a monument was installed in the town square of Harrison, Arkansas. On one side of this monument is a map and short summary of the massacre, while the opposite side contains a list of the victims. In 2005 a replica of the U.S. Army's original 1859 cairn was built in the community of Carrollton, Arkansas, the former county seat of Carroll County, Arkansas. it is maintained by the Mountain Meadows Monument Foundation.

In 2007, the 150th anniversary of the massacre was remembered by a ceremony held in the meadows. Approximately 400 people, including many descendants of those slain at Mountain Meadows and Elder Henry B. Eyring of the LDS Church's Quorum of the Twelve Apostles attended this ceremony.

In 2011, the site was designated as a National Historic Landmark after joint efforts by descendants of those killed and the LDS Church.

In 2014, archaeologist Everett Bassett discovered two rock piles he believes mark additional graves. The locations of the possible graves are on private land and not at any of the monument sites owned by the LDS Church. The Mountain Meadows Monument Foundation has expressed their desire that the sites are conserved and given national monument status. Other descendant groups have been more hesitant in accepting the sites as legitimate grave markers.

Media detailing the massacre

 Massacre at Mountain Meadows, by Ronald W. Walker, Richard E. Turley, Glen M. Leonard (2008)
 House of Mourning: A Biocultural History of the Mountain Meadows Massacre, by Shannon A. Novak (2008)
 Burying The Past: Legacy of The Mountain Meadows Massacre, a documentary film by Brian Patrick (2004)
 American Massacre: The Tragedy At Mountain Meadows, September 1857, by Sally Denton (2003)
 Blood of the Prophets: Brigham Young and the Massacre at Mountain Meadows, by Will Bagley (2002)
 The Mountain Meadows Massacre, by Juanita Brooks (1950)
  Mountain Meadows. – an article originally published in the Cincinnati Gazette (July 21, 1875), then republished in the St. Louis Globe-Democrat(July 26, 1875). An affidavit of James Lynch's testimony taken in July 1859 about the human remains Lynch saw at Mount Meadows in March and April 1858, about the living conditions of the child survivors of the Massacre during that time, and about the children's statements regarding the perpetrators of the Massacre. Lynch accompanied Dr. Jacob Forney, Superintendent of Indian Affairs, on an expedition to the area. The affidavit was given in front of Chief Justice of the Utah Territory Supreme Court Delana R. Eckels on July 27, 1859, and sent by US Army officer S.H. Montgomery to Commissioner of Indian Affairs A.B. Greenwood in August 1859.

Works of historical fiction

 Redeye, novel by Clyde Edgerton (1995) - A novel about a fictional bounty hunter, Cobb Pittman, who with his catch dog, Redeye, tracks down Mormons responsible for the Mountain Meadows Massacre.
 Red Water, novel by Judith Freeman (2002) – A novel about how the wives of John D. Lee have to come to terms with their husband's actions
 September Dawn  film by Christopher Cain (2007) – The film is a fictional love story between real characters who were involved in the massacre

See also

 List of National Historic Landmarks in Utah
 National Register of Historic Places listings in Washington County, Utah
 Anti-Mormonism
 Christian terrorism
 Christianity and violence
 Haun's Mill massacre, an attack on Mormons
 History of the Latter Day Saint movement
 Missouri Executive Order 44
 Mormonism and violence
 Salt Creek Canyon massacre
 Religious abuse
 Religious terrorism
 Religious violence
 Religious war
 Terrorism in the United States
 Domestic terrorism in the United States

References

Notes

Citations

Bibliography

 .
 
 .
 
 .
 
 .
 
 .
 .

 
 .
 .
 
  (scanned versions).
 
 
 .
 
 .
 Malinda (Cameron) Scott Thurston Deposition published by Mountain Meadows Association
 
 .
 .
 .
 .
 .
 .
 .
 .
 .

External links

 Mountain Meadows Association
 Mountain Meadows Monument Foundation
 PBS Frontline documentary: The Mormons, Part One, episodes 8 & 9: Mountain Meadows.
 The Mountain Meadows Massacre: A Bibliographic Perspective by Newell Bringhurst
 United States Office of Indian Affairs Papers Relating to Charges Against Jacob Forney. Yale Collection of Western Americana, Beinecke Rare Book and Manuscript Library.

 
1857 murders in the United States
1857 in Utah Territory
Massacres in 1857
American murder victims
Battles involving Native Americans
Crimes in Utah
Criticism of Mormonism
Deaths by firearm in Utah
Massacres in the United States
Mormonism and Native Americans
-
Murdered American children
Nauvoo Legion
Utah War